The South African State and Allied Workers' Union (SASAWU) is a trade union representing public sector workers in South Africa.

The union was founded on 14 July 2000.  Until 2015, it was affiliated with the Congress of South African Trade Unions, but it has since been independent.

References

Trade unions based in Johannesburg
Trade unions in South Africa
Public sector trade unions
Trade unions established in 2000